Olatapur is a village located in Bhadrak district of Odisha, India.
The village is close to the spiritual place akhandalamani (aradi).

Villages in Bhadrak district